Las señoritas Vivanco ("The Vivanco Ladies") is a 1959 Mexican film. It stars Sara García.

Cast
 Pedro Armendáriz - Gen. Inocencio Torrentera
 Ana Luisa Peluffo - Maruja Valverde
 Manolo Fábregas - Inspector Jorge Saldaña
 Sara García - Hortensia Vivanco y de la Vega
 Prudencia Grifell - Teresa Vivanco y de la Vega
 Marina Camacho - Lola
 José Luis Jiménez - don Esteban
 María Teresa Rivas - Adelaida Covarrubias
 Miguel Manzano - Eleuterio Covarrubias
 Aurora Alvarado - Cristina
 Rafael del Río - Jaimito
 Emma Arvizu - Raquel
 Claudio Brook - William
 Eugenia Galindo - Maria
 Carmen Salas - Trini

External links
 

1959 films
Mexican crime comedy-drama films
1950s Spanish-language films
1950s Mexican films